Malea was a town of ancient Lesbos.

The site of Malea is located near modern Akhlia.

References

Populated places in the ancient Aegean islands
Former populated places in Greece
Ancient Lesbos